Skobalj may refer to:

 Skobalj (Lajkovac), a village in Serbia
 Skobalj (Smederevo), a village in Serbia